The 1973–74 Nationalliga A season was the 36th season of the Nationalliga A, the top level of ice hockey in Switzerland. Eight teams participated in the league, and SC Bern won the championship.

Standings

External links 
 Championnat de Suisse 1973/74

Swiss
National League (ice hockey) seasons
1973–74 in Swiss ice hockey